Maria Anatolyevna Pechnikova (born 8 June 1992) is a Russian ice hockey player and member of the Russian national ice hockey team, currently serving as captain of Agidel Ufa in the Zhenskaya Hockey League (ZhHL). 

Pechnikova represented Russia at the IIHF Women's World Championships in 2012 and 2015, and won gold with the Russian team in the women's ice hockey tournament at the 2015 Winter Universiade.

References

External links 
 

1992 births
Living people
Sportspeople from Izhevsk
Russian women's ice hockey defencemen
Universiade medalists in ice hockey
Universiade gold medalists for Russia
Competitors at the 2015 Winter Universiade
HC Agidel Ufa players
HC SKIF players
Ice hockey players at the 2022 Winter Olympics
Olympic ice hockey players of Russia